Hepatoprotection or antihepatotoxicity is the ability of a chemical substance to prevent damage to the liver. This is opposite to hepatotoxicity.

Hepatoprotective molecules used in emergency medicine 
 Acetylcysteine is considered the hepatoprotective drug of choice when treating an overdose of acetaminophen/paracetamol.
 Silymarin is given intravenously to treat poisoning from Amanita mushrooms according to the Santa Cruz protocol devised by Dr Todd Mitchell at UCSC.

Herbs with potentially hepatoprotective constituents
 Astragalus membranaceus
 Curcuma longa
 Brassica
 Silybum marianum
 Andrographis paniculata

References

Hepatology